Sir Richard Dyott (c. 1591 – 8 March 1660) was an English lawyer and politician who sat in the House of Commons between 1623 and 1640. He was a Royalist during the English Civil War.

Dyott was the son of Anthony Dyott, Member of Parliament of Freeford Manor, near Lichfield. He was admitted to Inner Temple in 1615, and became Recorder of Stafford in 1624.

In 1623 Dyott was elected Member of Parliament for Stafford for two parliaments, and then in 1625 was elected Member of Parliament for Lichfield.  He held the seat until 1629 when King Charles I decided to rule without parliament. In April1640 he was re-elected for Lichfield for the Short Parliament. 
 
Dyott was knighted and was a member of the privy council of King Charles at York. He was  High Steward of Lichfield and  Chancellor of the County Palatine of Durham.

Dyott died at the age of 69.

Dyott married Dorothy Dorrington, daughter of Richard Dorrington of Stafford and had six sons. Three of them fought for the Royalists and one was killed in action. His son Richard was also Member of Parliament for Lichfield.

References

1590s births
1660 deaths
English MPs 1621–1622
English MPs 1624–1625
English MPs 1625
English MPs 1626
English MPs 1628–1629
English MPs 1640 (April)
Members of the Parliament of England (pre-1707) for Stafford
Lawyers from the Kingdom of England